The United States House of Representative elections of 2006 in North Carolina were held on 7 November 2006 as part of the biennial election to the United States House of Representatives.  All thirteen seats in North Carolina, and 435 nationwide, were elected.

The Democrats gained a seat, becoming the largest party in terms of both representatives and popular vote.  All incumbents ran again, with twelve of the thirteen winning re-election.  Republican incumbent Charles H. Taylor lost the 11th district, while fellow Republican Robin Hayes came close to losing in the 8th.

It is not to be confused with the election to the North Carolina House of Representatives, which was held on the same day.

Summary

Results

Footnotes

2006
2006 North Carolina elections
North Carolina